Margot Estévez (born 12 February 1968) is a Spanish gymnast. She competed in six events at the 1984 Summer Olympics.

References

1968 births
Living people
Spanish female artistic gymnasts
Olympic gymnasts of Spain
Gymnasts at the 1984 Summer Olympics
Gymnasts from Madrid
20th-century Spanish women